Longkou, formerly Huang County, is a port city in northeastern Shandong province, China, facing the Bohai Sea to the north and the Laizhou Bay to the west. Longkou, a county-level city, is administered by the prefecture-level city of Yantai. It is located in the northwest of Jiaodong Peninsula and the south bank of Bohai Bay, adjacent to Penglai District in the east, Qixia City and Zhaoyuan City in the south, Bohai Sea in the west and north, and facing Tianjin and Dalian across the sea. With a total area of 901 square kilometers, the city has jurisdiction over 5 subdistricts, 8 towns and 1 high-tech industrial park.

Longkou has been awarded many honors, such as National Civilized City, China Excellent Tourist City, National Health City, National Green Model City, National Garden City, National Sustainable Development Experimental Zone, National Ecological Protection and Construction Demonstration Zone, and provincial pilot county for transformation and upgrading of scientific development of county economy.

History
Huang County was the center of the ancient Dongyi state of Lai during China's Zhou dynasty. Under the Qing, it was administered as part of Dengzhou (now Penglai).

Huang County was renamed Longkou in 1986.

Administrative divisions
There are five subdistricts and eight towns under the city's administration:

Subdistricts:
Donglai Subdistrict, Longgang Subdistrict, Xinjia Subdistrict, Xufu Subdistrict, Dongjiang Subdistrict

Towns:
Huangshanguan, Beima, Lutou, Xiadingjia, Qijia, Shiliang, Langao, Zhuyouguan

Geography
Longkou is a coastal harbour city adjacent to Penglai city and Yantai urban area to the east, linked to Qingdao to the south.

The city can be roughly divided into four major built-up areas: a central urban area, Longkou harbour city, Donghai and Nanshan.

At the west coast of Longkou, there is one of China's largest land reclamation projects under development. It will encompass six artificial islands with an extent of approx. 10 to 10 km.

Longkou is quite mountainous in the south and flat plains to the north. It has with low hills in the southeast and littoral plains in the northwest. There are mountains and rivers surrounding Longkou. The annual average temperature within the city is 11.7 °C. Although longkou has pleasant temperature in summer, it could be extremely cold during winter

Climate

Economy
Longkou is well known for its production of cellophane noodles, it is home to the  New Dragon Asia Corporation head office as well as the Nanshan Group, an industrial conglomerate. Longkou is a port city with an international deep-water cargo port. It handles over 70.000 tons annually.

There is also a number of smaller industrial companies, such as Longkou Beer Equipment Co.

In 2021, the regional GDP and general public budget revenue of Longkou City reached 123.66 billion yuan and 11.2 billion yuan respectively, with an annual growth rate of 6.7% and 5% respectively.

Transport
Longkou is linked to the national expressway network of China via the G18 expressway (Weifang-Yantai) and the new S19 provincial expressway Longkou-Qingdao. There will be a highspeed rail connection via Weifang, currently this is still under construction. The closest airport is Yantai airport, about one hour east of Longkou.

Within the territory of the DaLailong Railway, Longyan railway and other railway trunk.

Education

Longkou is home to Yantai Nanshan University, a	private university offering bachelor's and master's degrees  and to a bilingual (Chinese-English) high school.

See also
Yantai
Cellophane noodles

References

External links
https://web.archive.org/web/20070820234504/https://web.archive.org/web/20180814022029/http://www.longkou.gov.cn/eng/eng.jsp (Official Government Website)

Cities in Shandong
Yantai